Lygropia cosmia is a moth in the family Crambidae. It is found in Panama.

The wingspan is about 15 mm. The wings are bronzy brown-black, the forewings with a costal yellow half-bar on the outer fourth. There is a double spot in the cell, conjoined below and touching an oblique broad half-band near the base of the inner margin. The hindwings are yellow at the base.

References

Moths described in 1914
Lygropia